John Lawrence Nettleship (1 August 1939 – 12 March 2011) was a British schoolteacher who taught chemistry at Wyedean School, Gloucestershire.  His pupils there included Joanne Rowling, and he has been stated to be a major inspiration for the character of Severus Snape in Rowling's Harry Potter series of fantasy novels.

Life
Nettleship was born in Nottingham, the son of Albert Victor Nettleship and Lilian (née Slack). He studied Chemistry at the University of Leeds in the late 1950s.  He joined the Labour Party at that time, and remained an active member for the rest of his life.  After leaving university, he taught in Birmingham, where he married and had three children; the marriage later ended in divorce and he remarried in the 1980s.

In 1970 he began teaching at Caldicot School in Monmouthshire, Wales, moving to become Head of Science at Wyedean School in Sedbury, Gloucestershire, a few miles away, in 1974.

As the Harry Potter series gained international recognition, Nettleship was often recognized as a personal character inspiration for Severus Snape. He described himself in hindsight as "a short-tempered chemistry teacher with long hair...[and a] gloomy, malodorous laboratory."  He was first questioned about his links to Rowling's character of Snape by journalists, saying: "I was horrified when I first found out. I knew I was a strict teacher but I didn't think I was that bad." After being initially unhappy about the comparison, Nettleship came to terms with the connection, and wrote a short book, Harry Potter's Chepstow, about Rowling's connections with Chepstow. He also gave talks on the connections that the Chepstow, Wye Valley and Forest of Dean areas had with the Harry Potter books.

Nettleship retired in 1997. As well as being an active member of the Labour Party, he was a member of Caerwent community council, serving as its chairman in 1991.  He was instrumental in setting up Caerwent Historic Trust, becoming its secretary and researching the history of the area.

He died of cancer in 2011, aged 71, after having been diagnosed in 2006. A spokeswoman for J. K. Rowling said that the author was sorry to hear of his death.

He was played by Andrew Kavadas in the J.K. Rowling biopic Magic Beyond Words.

References

External links
 
 

1939 births
2011 deaths
Alumni of the University of Leeds
Schoolteachers from Nottinghamshire
People from Nottingham